Wokingham railway station serves the market town of Wokingham in Berkshire, England. It is  down the line from  via Redhill. It is at the junction of the Waterloo to Reading line with the North Downs Line. 

South Western Railway manages the station and provides services along with Great Western Railway.

History
From its beginning the RG&RR was worked by the South Eastern Railway (SER), which bought the RG&RR in 1852.

The London and South Western Railway (LSWR) worked the SW&WJR and was authorised to run over the SER to Reading.

In 1933 the Southern Railway opened the current signal box. It controls part of the North Downs Line, part of the Waterloo route, and the level crossing. On 1 January 1939 the SR extended its Waterloo –  electric service to Wokingham and Reading.

In 1973 British Railways replaced Wokingham's station building with one built with CLASP prefabricated concrete sections. In 1987 BR slightly extended the platforms to accommodate eight-car Waterloo trains. Platform 2 ("down") has recently undergone a further extension to accommodate longer trains and the addition of a signal at the London end. This is for reversing trains in times of disruption and during the Reading station upgrade.

In 1976 the busy level crossing adjacent to the station was modernised with lifting barriers.

Footbridge 

At the southern end of the station there is a footbridge over the railway made from old sections of rail. The footbridge is over 130 years old, and was built after two deaths at the station's level crossing in 1886. It is now Grade II listed and is believed to be the only one of its type left in the UK. In 2017, various defects were found in the bridge's structure and Network Rail started restoration work in 2021 after initially having a planning application rejected.

Services
South Western Railway runs a service between London Waterloo and Reading. This runs every 30 minutes daily, with some extra peak time weekday services in either direction.

On Sundays, an hourly service operates on this route.

Wokingham station is an interchange for passengers between the Waterloo – Reading line and the North Downs Line.

Redevelopment 2013
In 2011, it was announced that Wokingham station would be redeveloped from spring 2012 to spring 2013 at a cost of £6 million. The initial plan involved a new station building further along the platform, nearer to Reading than the existing building and creating a new spur road linking Wellington Road to the Reading Road. An artist's impression of the new station building was released to the news media in July 2011. Enabling work for the link road was started on 11 February 2013. In August 2013, the new footbridge was opened to the public and, in October the same year, the new station building was opened, with the old 1973 CLASP building being demolished to make way for the new station sign and clock tower. However, following the development, South West Trains chose a new café chain to serve in the new building in place of that which had served in the old building, despite local opposition.

Automatic ticket gates were installed at the station in early 2019.

Gallery

Notes

External links

Map showing eastern Reading and its railways

Railway stations in Berkshire
DfT Category C2 stations
Railway station
Former South Eastern Railway (UK) stations
Railway stations in Great Britain opened in 1849
Railway stations served by Great Western Railway
Railway stations served by South Western Railway
1849 establishments in England
Grade II listed buildings in Berkshire